Akkad may refer to:
Akkad (city), the capital of the Akkadian Empire
Akkadian Empire, the first ancient empire of Mesopotamia
Akkad SC, Iraqi football club

People with the name
Abbas el-Akkad, Egyptian writer
Abdulrahman Akkad, Syrian LGBT activist
Bahaa el-Din Ahmed Hussein el-Akkad, Egyptian Muslim imam
Hassan Akkad, Syrian photographer and filmmaker
Mohammed Akkad, Syrian politician, Governor of Aleppo 2012 to 2014
Moustapha Akkad, Syrian-American film producer and director
Omar El Akkad (born 1982), Egyptian-Canadian novelist and journalist

See also
List of kings of Akkad
"Akkad Bakkad", song from the 2016 Indian film Sanam Re
Akkad Bakkad Bambey Bo, an Indian television series
Akkad Bakkad Rafu Chakkar, an Indian web series
Akkadian language, an ancient language of Mesopotamia

Arabic-language surnames